The 1913 Kansas Jayhawks football team was an American football team that represented the University of Kansas as a member of the Missouri Valley Conference (MVC) during the 1913 college football season. In their second and final season under head coach Arthur Mosse, the Jayhawks compiled a 5–3 record (3–2 against conference opponents), finished in third place in the MVC, and outscored opponents by a total of 120 to 40. The Jayhawks played their home games at McCook Field in Lawrence, Kansas. William D. Weidlein was the team captain.

Schedule

References

Kansas
Kansas Jayhawks football seasons
Kansas Jayhawks football